Massimo Bray (born 11 April 1959) is an Italian intellectual and politician, who served as the minister of culture from 28 April 2013 to 22 February 2014.

Early life and education
Bray was born in Lecce on 11 April 1959. He studied philosophy and literature in various cities, including Florence, Naples, Venice, Paris and Simancas.

Career
Bray is an academic publisher and a magazine editor. He was on the editorial board of the Italian Institute of Human Sciences until 1994. He is the cofounder of Notte della Taranta, which is among the most popular music festivals in Europe. He launched a blog on the Italian-language version of the Huffington Post.

Bray is a member of the Democratic Party. He was appointed minister of culture to the cabinet led by the prime minister Enrico Letta on 28 April 2013. He replaced Lorenzo Ornaghi in the post. Bray's term ended in February 2014 when he was replaced by Dario Franceschini who was appointed to the post in the Matteo Renzi cabinet.

References

External links

20th-century Italian journalists
1959 births
Culture ministers of Italy
Democratic Party (Italy) politicians
Government ministers of Italy
Italian magazine editors
Letta Cabinet
Living people
People from Lecce